The International Entente of Radical and Similar Democratic Parties, also known as the Radical International,  was a political international of classical-radical and left-leaning liberal political parties existed from 1924 until 1938.

History
Establishment followed pattern of similar organizations such as Labour and Socialist International, adapted for various centrist parties. First constituent meeting of the International Entente of Radical and Similar Democratic Parties were organized on 29 August 1924 in Geneva under leadership of later Nobel Peace Prize awardee Ferdinand Buisson, who later acted as the President of the executive committee.

After 1938, the organization ceased operating, but some of the member parties, later in 1947, founded the broader organization Liberal International.

Organization

Structure
Objective of the organization were to connect various political parties associated with liberalism and classical radicalism to promote essential democracy. Its intellectual operation were closely associated with the League of Nations. Organization were directed by the executive committee, consisting of delegates of some of the member parties. Organizational seat were located at headquarters of the French Radical Party at Volois Palace, Rue de Valois, Paris.

After foundation of the International Entente, it included member parties of Belgium, Bulgaria, Czechoslovakia, Finland, France, Denmark, Greece, the Netherlands, New Zealand, Norway, Poland, Romania, Sweden, Switzerland, Turkey and the United Kingdom.

Congresses
 1928: London, United Kingdom
 1934: Copenhagen, Denmark
 1935: London, United Kingdom

Member parties

See also
Liberal International

References

1923 establishments in France
Organizations established in 1923
1938 disestablishments in France
Organizations disestablished in 1938
Political internationals
Radicalism (historical)
International liberal organizations
Anti-fascist organizations
Organizations based in Paris
Defunct organizations based in France
League of Nations